The Tower Street drill hall is a military installation in York.  It lies on Tower Street, in the city centre.

History
The building, which was designed as the headquarters of the 6th and 7th companies, the 1st East Riding of Yorkshire Artillery Volunteers, was completed in 1885. The unit evolved to become the 9th (West Riding and Staffordshire) Medium Brigade, Royal Garrison Artillery in 1920 and 54th (West Riding and Staffordshire) Medium Brigade, Royal Garrison Artillery in 1921 before relocating to Lumley Barracks in York in 1924.

Meanwhile the drill hall had also become the headquarters of the Yorkshire Hussars early in the 20th century. The unit evolved to become the Queen's Own Yorkshire Yeomanry in 1956 but relocated to more modern facilities at Yeomanry Barracks in York.

Instead the building became the headquarters of the Prince of Wales's Own Regiment of Yorkshire in 1958 and of its successor regiment, the Yorkshire Regiment, in 2006.

Museum
The building also became home to a military museum, subsequently known as the York Army Museum, in 1984. The museum inherited the collections of the Royal Dragoon Guards and of the Prince of Wales's Own Regiment of Yorkshire and is creating a collection on behalf of the Yorkshire Regiment. Following an expansion of the museum financed by the Heritage Lottery Fund, the Duke of York visited the building in May 2015.

References

Drill halls in England
Buildings and structures in York